Farmer In The Sky is a 1950 science fiction novel by American writer Robert A. Heinlein about a teenaged boy who emigrates with his family to Jupiter's moon Ganymede, which is in the process of being terraformed. Among Heinlein's juveniles, a condensed version of the novel was published in serial form in Boys' Life magazine (August, September, October, November 1950), under the title "Satellite Scout". The novel was awarded a Retro Hugo in 2001.

Passing references by the lead character to the song "The Green Hills of Earth" and to its author, Rhysling, have caused some to consider it part of Heinlein's Future History series.

Plot summary

In the future, food is carefully rationed on an overcrowded Earth. Teenager William (Bill) Lermer lives with his widowed father, George. George decides to emigrate to the farming colony on Ganymede, one of Jupiter's moons.  After marrying Molly Kenyon, George embarks with Bill and Molly's daughter Peggy on the 'torchship' Mayflower. On the journey, Bill saves his bunkmates from asphyxiation by improvising a patch when a meteor punctures their compartment. During the trip, all the children attend class; also, to combat the boredom of the long trip, the Boy Scouts among the passengers form troops.

When they arrive on Ganymede, an unpleasant surprise awaits the newcomers. The arriving group is much larger than the colony can easily absorb. The soil has to be built from scratch by pulverizing boulders and lava flows, then seeding the resulting dust with carefully formulated organic material, and the rock crushers are in short supply. While some whine about the injustice of it all, Bill accepts an invitation to live with his prospective neighbors, a prosperous farmer and his large, hard-working family, to learn the needed skills, while his father signs on as an engineer in the town of Leda. Peggy, unable to adjust to the low pressure atmosphere, has to stay in a bubble in the hospital. When the Lermers are finally reunited on their own homestead, they build their house with a pressurized room for Peggy.

One day, a rare alignment of all of Jupiter's major moons causes a devastating moonquake. Peggy is seriously injured when her room suffers an explosive decompression. Furthermore, the machinery that maintains Ganymede's "heat trap" fails and the temperature starts dropping rapidly. George quickly realizes what has happened and gets his family to the safety of the town. Others do not grasp their peril soon enough and either stay in their homes or start for town too late; two-thirds of the colonists perish, either from the quake or by freezing. The Lermers consider returning to Earth, but after Peggy dies, they decide to stay and rebuild. The colony gradually recovers.

An expedition sets out to survey more of Ganymede. Bill goes along as the cook. While exploring, he and a friend discover artifacts of an alien civilization, including a working land vehicle that has legs, like a large metal centipede. This proves fortuitous when Bill's appendix bursts. Forced to adhere to a schedule, a shuttle picks up the rest of the group and leaves without the pair. They travel cross-country using the alien vehicle to reach the next landing site. Bill is then taken to the hospital for a life-saving operation.

Upon awakening from the operation, Bill contemplates a discussion he had with George about returning to Earth for school, or pursuing a job working towards the colonization of Callisto. He notices that it was midnight and decides to see it for himself, as it may be his last chance to do so for a long time. Upon looking at the sky and observing Jupiter in half phase with Io coming out of shadow, and the Sun breaking above the horizon with light catching the snow of the mountains, he decides that Ganymede is his home and he would never leave it. The nurse finds him outdoors and scolds him to return where he belongs, to which he replies, "I am where I belong, and I'm going to stay."

Reception

Groff Conklin wrote that although Farmer in the Sky was "conceived as a novel for 'adolescents' ... this book is also one of the best of the month's output in science fiction for adults ... an adventure story with an unusual amount of realism in its telling. It is not childish". Boucher and McComas named Farmer "just about the only mature science fiction novel of the year [1950]", describing it as "a magnificently detailed study of the technological and human problems of interplanetary colonization." Damon Knight found the novel "a typical Heinlein story ... typically brilliant, thorough and readable." P. Schuyler Miller recommended the novel unreservedly, saying that Heinlein's "minute attention to detail ... has never been more fascinatingly shown."

Surveying Heinlein's juvenile novels, Jack Williamson noted that Farmer in the Sky  "has harsh realism for a juvenile." He described it as "a novel of education" where the protagonist "tell[s] his own story in a relaxed conversational style."

Major themes
The book takes up consciously many of the themes of the 19th century American frontier and homesteading - but without the moral stain of dispossessing the Native Americans. In particular, a character who grows an apple tree and offers seeds to other colonists comes to be known as "Johnny Appleseed" (and survives with his family at the moment of disaster by burning his precious tree).

Scientific details

The "heat trap", which allows humans to live on Ganymede, is a man-made implementation of the greenhouse effect, although its mechanism is never explained. This effect could be achieved in reality by releasing large quantities of super greenhouse gases, which would not require a constant power supply, and would therefore be unaffected by a disaster such as that described in the book.

Decades after publication it was discovered that the magnetosphere of Jupiter encloses Ganymede and the other Galilean moons in an analog of Earth's Van Allen radiation belt, subjecting their surfaces to an intense rain of ionizing radiation. The Galileo flyby in 1995 discovered that Ganymede has a magnetosphere, but the shielding effect is weak; it is believed that the surface radiation intensity would still be lethal within months, 

The alignment of Jupiter's four major moons as described in the book can never happen in reality. The three inner Galilean satellites are in a resonance with one another such that whenever two of them are aligned, the third will always be non-aligned and quite often situated on the opposite side of Jupiter.

The book describes Ganymede as having about 1/3 Earth gravity but in reality it is only about 1/7.

Heinlein also postulated that the surface of Ganymede was volcanic rock like the Moon.  Subsequent discoveries have shown that Ganymede's crust is actually almost 90 percent ice or frost, covering a subsurface ocean.

The novel refers to the "Space Patrol", the interplanetary peace-keeping organization described in Space Cadet.

Because it was originally written to be serialized in the Boy Scout magazine Boys' Life, Bill Lermer's participation in the Scouts is pervasive, mentioned at least once per chapter.

References

External links

Satellite Scout parts one, two, three, and four on Google Books

1950 American novels
Novels by Robert A. Heinlein
American science fiction novels
Scouting in popular culture
Fiction set on Ganymede (moon)
Novels first published in serial form
Works originally published in Boys' Life
1950 science fiction novels
Children's science fiction novels
Space Western novels
Overpopulation fiction